Ibitoru I.B. Green, better known as Lady IB, is a singer from Bonny, Rivers State, Nigeria. She was elected Chair of the Performing Musicians Association of Nigeria Rivers State Branch in 2013, and is the second woman, after Muma Gee, to hold the position. After serving for about a year, she was re-elected to the same office for a second term. She has worked with artists such as Daniel Wilson, King Sunny Brown, Don Bruce, Geraldo Pino and Prince David Bull, among others.

Awards

Odudu Music Awards

!Ref
|-
|rowspan="1"|2011
|"This Is My Time"
|Best Vocal (Female)
|
|

See also
List of people from Rivers State
Music of Port Harcourt

References

Living people
Singers from Rivers State
People from Bonny
21st-century Nigerian women singers
Year of birth missing (living people)